is a Japanese wrestler who competes for Dragon Gate. 

He plays the Jackson Florida character, who is a popular masked comedy wrestler in the promotion. He debuted the character on July 3, 2005, in a tag match where he and Johnson Florida battled the Florida Brothers, Michael Iwasa & Daniel Mishima. His character is the uncle of the Florida Brothers, and he has earned the nickname "The Stuntman" because of his high-risk wrestling style. His risk taking is always unsuccessful, however, which provides much of the character's comedy. In particular, he has missed his diving knee drop so many times that he requires the use of a cane to walk and wrestle, and what's worse, he refuses to stop using the move. Despite this, he has managed to become a three-time Open the Owarai Gate Champion. As the Owarai Gate Championship is decided based on fan support rather than actually winning matches, his poor win-loss record doesn't prevent him from being a staple of the division.

He competed for the Tozawa-juku stable under his real name, joining in 2006 as their flag bearer. However, he was used sporadically during his whole tenure, and spent a lot of time injured. When the unit was brought to an end on November 16, 2008, after his stablemates Akira Tozawa, Taku Iwasa & Kenichiro Arai lost a match to Open the Triangle Gate champions Masaaki Mochizuki, Don Fujii & Magnitude Kishiwada, he and his stablemates were given a graduation ceremony. He competed solely on the Jackson Florida character until his departure from the company at the end of 2011.

Championships and accomplishments 
Dragon Gate
Dragon Gate Open the Owarai Gate Championship (3 times)

External links
 Puroresu Central: Kouji Shishido
 Jackson Florida profile at I heart DG

1972 births
Living people
Japanese male professional wrestlers
Sportspeople from Fukushima Prefecture
People from Fukushima, Fukushima
20th-century professional wrestlers
21st-century professional wrestlers
Open the Owarai Gate Champions